George Brinton McClellan Jr. (November 23, 1865November 30, 1940), was an American statesman, author, historian, and educator. The son of the American Civil War general and presidential candidate George B. McClellan, he was the 93rd Mayor of New York City, serving from 1904 to 1909.

Life and career
McClellan, known to his family as "Max", was born in Dresden, Kingdom of Saxony (Germany), where his parents were visiting. He went to school in Trenton in New Jersey – where his father was Governor – and later Saint John's School in Ossining, New York. From 1885 to 1888 he served in the New York Army National Guard. He received his Bachelor of Arts degree at Princeton in 1886 and his Master of Arts in 1889; Princeton, Fordham University, and Union College later gave him the honorary degree of Doctor of Laws. After leaving school, he engaged in reportorial and editorial work at the New York World and other newspapers. In 1892 he was admitted to the bar. He served for some time as secretary and treasurer of the New York and Brooklyn Bridge.

New York City politics
In 1892, McClellan was elected president of the Board of Aldermen of New York City for the following two years, and for a part of 1894 he served as acting mayor. His success and popularity enabled him in 1895 to become a United States Congressman (as a Democrat), a position he held until resigning to become mayor in late 1903. In Congress, he was a prominent member of the Ways and Means Committee. While in Congress McClellan made speeches in favor of the gold standard, an issue that divided the fiscally conservative from the agrarian wing of the Democratic Party, although he avoided committing himself on the subject in the campaign of 1896.

Mayor of New York City
In November 1903, McClellan defeated the sitting mayor, Seth Low (independent Fusion), for a two-year term. He was re-elected in 1905, after the restoration of four-year mayoral terms, but not considered for a third term in 1909.

He is notable in the history of movie censorship for canceling all moving-picture exhibition licenses on Christmas Eve 1908, claiming that the new medium degraded the morals of the community and that celluloid film was an unacceptable fire hazard.

On October 27, 1904, the Interborough Rapid Transit, New York City's first subway, opened. McClellan was to start the first train at the City Hall Station, and then hand it over to an IRT motorman. However, he was enjoying himself so much that he refused to give up the controls until the train reached 103rd Street Station.

U.S. Presidential candidacy
McClellan ran for president in 1904, receiving 3 votes on the first ballot at the Democratic National Convention.

Later career

Throughout his political career, McClellan remained interested in education and in 1906 he was named honorary Chancellor of Union College.  At Princeton he delivered the Stafford Little lectures on public affairs (1908–1910), served as university lecturer (1911–1912) and was subsequently 
appointed a professor of economic history.

McClellan served in World War I entering the Army as major assigned to the Ordnance Department in May 1917 and he was honorably discharged in May 1919 with the rank of lieutenant colonel.

Personal life

McClellan married Georgiana Heckscher on October 30, 1889.

McClellan died on November 30, 1940, one week after his 75th birthday, and was buried in Arlington National Cemetery.

Selected works
 The Oligarchy of Venice. Boston: Houghton Mifflin, 1904.
 The Heel of War. New York: G.W. Dillingham Company, 1916.
 Venice and Bonaparte. Princeton: Princeton University Press, 1931.
 Modern Italy: A Short History. Princeton: Princeton University Press, 1933.
 The Gentleman and the Tiger: The Autobiography of George B. McClellan Jr.. Philadelphia: J.B. Lippincott, 1956.

See also
Mayor of New York City
List of mayors of New York City
New York City mayoral elections

References
Notes

Sources

Further reading
 Mulrine, M. Barbara. The Price of Honor: The Life and Times of George Brinton McClellan Jr. (2011), The standard scholarly biography
 Syrett, Harold C., "Introduction" to  The Gentleman and the Tiger: The Autobiography of George B. McClellan Jr.. (1956) pp 9–39

External links

From Regulation to Censorship: Film and Political Culture in New York in the Early Twentieth Century
 

 

1865 births
1940 deaths
Mayors of New York City
Heads of universities and colleges in the United States
Princeton University alumni
Burials at Arlington National Cemetery
New York (state) lawyers
Candidates in the 1904 United States presidential election
20th-century American politicians
United States Army colonels
United States Army personnel of World War I
Democratic Party members of the United States House of Representatives from New York (state)
McClellan family